WIGS is a web channel, part of the YouTube Original Channel Initiative. It presents web series, short films and documentaries about the lives of women. WIGS targets a female audience. Most videos are around five to ten minutes in length.

The channel was co-created by Jon Avnet, producer of Black Swan and Risky Business, and Rodrigo Garcia, who directed Albert Nobbs and In Treatment.

History 
Jon Avnet and Rodrigo Garcia developed and wrote a handful of series and recruited writers and directors such as Lesli Linka Glatter, Rose Troche, Amy Lippman, Marta Kauffman, and Julia Stiles, to direct projects for the channel. They have recruited actors such as Jennifer Beals, Jena Malone, Troian Bellisario, and Julia Stiles.

WIGS officially launched on May 14, 2012. The channel's first season includes 100 episodes of short films, series and documentaries. "Jan," written and directed by Jon Avnet, was the first series released by WIGS. While the channel's tagline "Where it gets interesting" does not fully match the acronym WIGS; on their website, the words "Where It Gets . . ." are used to begin to describe each series, and the last word is changed. For example, for the first series, "Jan," the tagline is, "Where It Gets Spicy." 

On February 19, 2013, Fox announced the launch of an event series and multiplatform programming department and a multiyear partnership with WIGS. The multiyear programming, marketing and distribution pact with WIGS was intended to serve as an incubator for original content that can be programmed on Fox or other networks. WIGS will fall under Fox's Shana C. Waterman's purview.

In May 2013, WIGS celebrated its first anniversary and combined viewing figures of over 33 million. The channel was at that point YouTube's number one channel for scripted drama.

Beginning in June 2013, WIGS released seven of its series ("Blue,"  "Lauren," "Jan," "Christine," "Ruth & Erica," "Audrey," and "Vanessa & Jan") on Hulu under the FOX banner. The series were recut into fewer, longer episodes for the new medium.

In September 2013, WIGS announced that "Blue" would return for a 3rd season, adding Eric Stoltz and Alexz Johnson to the cast.

Series 
The channel features series that follow the lives of different women. The stories include a poker player on a losing streak, a mother with a secret life and one that follows a woman on a series of speed dates. Many of them follow a woman's professional life, romance, war, or family structures.

Awards and accolades

References

External links
 YouTube Channel
 Official Website

YouTube channels